Sticks and Bones is a 1971 play by David Rabe. The black comedy focuses on David, a blind Vietnam War veteran who finds himself unable to come to terms with his actions on the battlefield and alienated from his family because they neither can accept his disability nor understand his wartime experience. Rabe explores the conflicted feelings of many civilians during the era by parodying the ideal American family as it was portrayed on the television sitcom The Adventures of Ozzie and Harriet. Beneath the perfect facade of the playwright's fictional Nelson family are layers of prejudice, bigotry, and self-hatred that are peeled away slowly as they interact with their physically and emotionally damaged son and brother.

History
Sticks and Bones was the second play in Rabe's Vietnam trilogy, following The Basic Training of Pavlo Hummel and preceding Streamers. A veteran himself, he wrote it while a graduate student at Villanova University, where it was staged in 1969. The off-Broadway production, directed by Jeff Bleckner, opened on November 7, 1971 at Joseph Papp's Public Theater, where it ran for 121 performances. The cast included David Selby as David, Tom Aldredge as Ozzie, Elizabeth Wilson as Harriet (played later by Rue McClanahan),  Cliff DeYoung as Rick, and Charles Siebert as Father Donald.

Critical reaction and audience response were positive, and Papp decided to move the play uptown. With Drew Snyder replacing Selby but the rest of the cast intact, the Broadway production opened on March 1, 1972 at the John Golden Theatre, where it ran for 246 performances.

In 1973, David Rabe wrote the teleplay for and Robert Downey Sr. directed a CBS television movie based on Rabe's play. The cast included DeYoung as David, Aldredge as Ozzie, and Anne Jackson as Harriet. The subject matter was so controversial half of the network's affiliates refused to broadcast the film.

Awards and nominations
Awards
1972 Tony Award for Best Play
1972 Tony Award for Best Performance by a Featured Actress in a Play (Elizabeth Wilson)
1972 Drama Desk Award for Outstanding Actor in a Play (Tom Aldredge)
1972 Drama Desk Award for Outstanding Director of a Play (Jeff Bleckner)
1972 Drama Desk Award for Outstanding Set Design (Santo Loquasto)
1972 Outer Critics Circle Award for Best Play

Nominations
1972 Tony Award for Best Direction of a Play (Jeff Bleckner)
1972 Tony Award for Best Performance by a Leading Actor in a Play (Tom Aldredge)

Influence
The play was parodied by Christopher Durang in his 1977 play The Vietnamization of New Jersey.

Revival 
In 2014, Sticks and Bones was revived at The Pershing Square Center, with the production opening November 6.

References

External links
 
 
 

1971 plays
Broadway plays
Plays by David Rabe
Drama Desk Award-winning plays
Tony Award-winning plays
Vietnam War fiction